Mariam Ndagire (born 16 May 1971), is a Ugandan singer, entertainer, actress, playwright, film director, and film producer.

Beginnings and education
She was born in Kampala, Uganda's capital city, to Sarah Nabbutto and Buganda's Prince Kizito Ssegamwenge. She attended Buganda Road Primary School, before transferring to Kampala High School, where she completed her O-level education. For her A-Level studies, she attended Trinity College Nabbingo, in Wakiso District, where she graduated with a High School Diploma.

She went on to obtain a Higher Diploma in Marketing from Makerere University Business School in Nakawa. Later, she was awarded a Diploma in Music, Dance and Drama, from Makerere University, Uganda's oldest and largest public university.

Performing career 
Ndagire started out as a theatre actress, at age 15, which still a student at Kampala High School. She went on to join the Black Pearls of Omugave Ndugwa in 1987, where she starred in several plays up until 1993. While there, she co-wrote her first play titled "Engabo Y'addako". Later Ndagire, together with Kato Lubwama and Ahraf Simwogerere formed their own group the Diamonds' Ensemble and they wrote several plays.

Ndagire is so passionate about helping young talent find themselves in the performing arts; that is the reason that she started The Next Ugandan Music, an American Idol-style show. Ndagire also started a new training workshop for filmmakers at her center, the Mariam Ndagire Film and Performing Arts Centre MNFPAC, which holds film workshops for filmmakers every year. Among the workshops' notable participants are Sarah Kisauzi Sentongo, an actress with Deception, the NTV Uganda TV series, and screenwriter Usama Mukwaya.

In 2015 Ndagire was appointed by AFRICA MAGIC VIEWERS' CHOICE AWARDS AMVCA to be part of the JURY

In 2019 Ndagire was appointed as a committee member of the Grand Jury of the GOLDEN MOVIE AWARDS AFRICA

Film and television

Awards and nominations

Partial discography
Mulongo Wange (1997)
Bamugamba (1998)
Onkyaye (2000)
Nkusibiddawo (2001)
Kamuwaane (2002)
Abakazi Twalaba (2003)
Akulimbalimba (2004)
Akalaboko (2007)
Maama (2007)
Byonna Twala (2009)
Majangwa (2009)
Oly'omu (2012)
Kiki Onvuma (2014)
Kibun'omu (2016)

References

External links 

Living people
1971 births
Ugandan film directors
Ugandan women film directors
21st-century Ugandan women singers
Ugandan screenwriters
Maisha Film Lab alumni
Ganda people
Ugandan actresses
People educated at Trinity College Nabbingo
20th-century Ugandan women singers